Tonti may refer to:

People
Aldo Tonti (1910–1988), Italian cinematographer
Andrea Tonti (born 1976), Italian cyclist
Giulio Tonti (1844–1918), Italian Roman Catholic archbishop and cardinal
Henri de Tonti, French-Italian explorer
Lino Tonti (1920–2002), Italian motorcycle engineer

Places
Detonti, Arkansas, unincorporated community, United States
Tontitown, Arkansas, city, United States
Tonti Township, Marion County, Illinois, United States
Tonti, Illinois, unincorporated community, United States

See also

Tonni (name)
 Tontine (disambiguation)

Italian-language surnames